Joe Grimaldi (born August 23, 1986) is an American former professional ice hockey defenseman.

Early life
Undrafted in the NHL, drafted in seventh round by the Windsor Spitfires in the Ontario Hockey League. He was soon asked to play for Team USA at age 16. Grimaldi was a part of the United States National Team Development Program from 2002–04, Grimaldi to ranked top 40 players in the world from 2002 to 2004. He won one a gold medal at the four nations cup and an International Ice Hockey Federation silver medal in Minsk at the world championships in 2004 before being offered athletic scholarships from the University of Nebraska Omaha, Boston College,Ohio State University, Harvard University, Miami University, and the University of New Hampshire. Grimaldi chose to enroll at the University of Nebraska Omaha of the CCHA. At the time, Grimaldi was youngest player to join the Mavericks in the history of the program. 

In the 2004–05 season Grimaldi scored 21 points and was named to the CCHA All-Rookie Team. Also USCHO.com named him to the all-American rookie team. The University of Nebraska Omaha named him most consistent player with +24 plus/minus leading all of college hockey in the 2004–2005 season.

Career 
In his second year with the Mavericks, he left for major junior hockey in the Ontario Hockey League with the Ottawa 67's. Brian Kilrea helmed the bench as head coach. While he was with the 67's he signed with the New York Islanders. He played exhibition games with the Islanders before getting sent back to Ottawa for future development. In the 2007–08 season, Grimaldi turned pro officially and signed with the Rochester Americans, an affiliate of the Buffalo Sabres, and was later sent down to the Elmira Jackals (Ottawa Senators) of the ECHL. Grimaldi played in 36 games recording 15 points as a rookie with the Jackals and made his AHL debut with the Rochester Americans and Albany River Rats, an affiliate of the Carolina Hurricanes. On January 15, 2008, Grimaldi was traded to fellow ECHL team the Fresno Falcons, affiliate to the San Jose Sharks. He was then later flipped to the Gwinnett Gladiators on February 19. He then played for his sixth team in the year when he was called up to the Peoria Rivermen affiliate for the St. Louis Blues. During his four-game stint, he recorded one assist in the last four games of the season.
Grimaldi started the 2008–09 season with the Cincinnati Cyclones of the ECHL before returning to the Jackals placing third on the team with 101 penalty minutes. He attended Elmira's training camp prior to the 2009–10 but because of his previous ankle injury from the year before was not cleared to play yet, and later signed a contract midway through the season on December 12, 2009. However, after playing in 33 games with Elmira before departing the team on March 17, 2010.

Grimaldi had retired after the 2010 season due to numerous injuries, but the following year signed in the Central Hockey League with the Colorado Eagles. The eagles hold the record for most championships in professional ice hockey. It is known as one of the most professional organizations in the United States. Grimaldi tallied 40 points pushing the eagles to the championships (June 2011) against the Mudbugs. Grimaldi later signed in the GET Ligaen in Norway.

Later in his career, Grimaldi joined the Nottingham Panthers of the Elite Ice Hockey League (EIHL) for the 2013–2014 season. He played seven games before being released, tallying 8 points (2 goals, 6 assists). During his brief stint, Grimaldi racked up 110 penalty minutes. The Edinburgh Capitals of the same EIHL league chose to bring him back for the 2014–15 season. Grimaldi played until his release on January 4, 2015, stemming from an incident the previous evening. On January 3, 2015, playing against his former team the Nottingham Panthers, Grimaldi took exception to Max Parent of the Panthers in which he was seen to spear the player intentionally with his stick, almost going for a second attempt. He then proceeded to remove his helmet and throw it at Parent's face, following immediately with a punch to the face and dragging him to the ground. Parent picked himself up and eventually toppled Grimaldi. Thrown out of the game, picking up 67 minutes' worth of penalties, Grimaldi was released the following day amidst the impending ban confirmed days later by the DOPS (Department of Player Safety) of 18 games.

Career statistics

Regular season and playoffs

International

Awards and honors

References

External links

University of Nebraska-Omaha Profile Page
Edinburgh Capitals Sack Joe Grimaldi After Gutless Spearing Attack

1986 births
Living people
American men's ice hockey defensemen
Albany River Rats players
Cincinnati Cyclones (ECHL) players
Colorado Eagles players
Elmira Jackals (ECHL) players
Evansville IceMen players
Fresno Falcons players
Gwinnett Gladiators players
Ice hockey players from New York (state)
Omaha Mavericks men's ice hockey players
Ottawa 67's players
People from Ronkonkoma, New York
Peoria Rivermen (AHL) players
Rapid City Rush players
Rochester Americans players
Rosenborg IHK players
Nottingham Panthers players
Edinburgh Capitals players
USA Hockey National Team Development Program players
Canadian expatriate ice hockey players in Scotland
Canadian expatriate ice hockey players in Norway
Canadian expatriate ice hockey players in Italy